A Girl Without Boundaries (German: Mädchen ohne Grenzen)  is a 1955 West German drama film directed by Géza von Radványi and starring  starring Sonja Ziemann, Ivan Desny and Barbara Rütting.  It was shot at the Bavaria Studios in Munich and on location in Athens, Fürstenfeldbruck and Munich-Riem Airport. The film's sets were designed by the art directors Hans Sohnle and Gottfried Will.

Synopsis
A stewardess falls in love with a passenger, an industrialist, while on a trip to Athens. He proposes to her but she discovers that he already has a wife and child.

Cast 
 Sonja Ziemann as Helga Gruber
 Ivan Desny as Eric Johnson
 Barbara Rütting as Maria Johnson
 Claus Biederstaedt as Georg Hartman
 Maria Sebaldt as Lissy Wedekind
 Michael Janisch as Olaf Haagerlund
 Ginette Pigeon as Marion
 Louis de Funès 
 Gabrielle Steffan
 Rolf von Nauckhoff
 Wolf Petersen
 Pero Alexander
 Michael Burk

References

Bibliography
 Bock, Hans-Michael & Bergfelder, Tim. The Concise CineGraph. Encyclopedia of German Cinema. Berghahn Books, 2009.
 Wiesen, Jonathan. West German Industry and the Challenge of the Nazi Past: 1945–1955. University of North Carolina Press, 2004.

External links 
 

1955 films
German black-and-white films
Films directed by Géza von Radványi
German drama films
1955 drama films
West German films
1950s German films
1950s German-language films
Films shot in Athens
Films shot in Bavaria
Films shot at Bavaria Studios